Pio Tabaiwalu (born 1959/1960 – 20 October 2020) was a Fijian diplomat and politician who was member of the SODELPA party.

References

Date of birth missing
2020 deaths
Fijian politicians
Social Democratic Liberal Party politicians